The Australian cricket team played Pakistan in a five-match One Day International series and one Twenty20 match starting from 22 April 2009 to 7 May 2009 in the United Arab Emirates. The series was named 'The Chapal Cup' and is the first game since 2002.

Background
The Australia national cricket team was scheduled to tour Pakistan in March and April 2008, to play three Test matches and five One Day Internationals. The tour was cancelled by Australia due to concerns about the security of playing in the country. Following the 2008 general elections in Pakistan, there was continual violence, and some of the Australian players spoke about against travelling to compete in the series.

ODI series part was held in UAE as part of this tour, while the test series was held in England as part of Australian cricket team against Pakistan in England in 2010.

Teams 

Australia originally chose Brett Geeves and Brett Lee in the squad but both were ruled out due to injury.

ODI series

1st ODI

2nd ODI

3rd ODI

4th ODI

5th ODI

T20I match

External links
"Australia and Pakistan tour of UAE, 2009"

References

2009 in Australian cricket
2009 in Pakistani cricket
2009 in Emirati cricket
2009
Cricket in the United Arab Emirates
International cricket competitions in 2009
Pakistani cricket seasons from 2000–01